The 2013 China Open was a tennis tournament played on outdoor hard courts. It was the 15th edition of the China Open for the men (17th for the women), and part of the ATP 500 Series of the 2013 ATP World Tour, and of the Premier Series of the 2013 WTA Tour. Both the men's and the women's events were held at the National Tennis Center in Beijing, China, from September 28 till October 6, 2013.

Points and prize money

Point distribution

Prize money

ATP singles main-draw entrants

Seeds 

 1 Rankings are as of September 23, 2013

Other entrants 
The following players received wildcards into the singles main draw:
  Lleyton Hewitt
  Wu Di
  Zhang Ze

The following players received entry from the qualifying draw:  
  Roberto Bautista Agut  
  Somdev Devvarman
  Santiago Giraldo
  Yen-hsun Lu

Withdrawals 
Before the tournament
  Marin Čilić (suspension)
  Ernests Gulbis
  Jerzy Janowicz (back injury)
  Martin Kližan
During the tournament
  Nikolay Davydenko (right wrist injury)

Retirements
  Tomáš Berdych (back injury)

ATP doubles main-draw entrants

Seeds

 Rankings are as of September 23, 2013

Other entrants
The following pairs received wildcards into the doubles main draw:
  Gong Maoxin /  Li Zhe
  Lu Yen-hsun /  Wu Di

Withdrawals 
During the tournament
  Stanislas Wawrinka (right leg injury)

WTA singles main-draw entrants

Seeds 

 1 Rankings are as of September 23, 2013

Other entrants 
The following players received wildcards into the singles main draw:
  Francesca Schiavone
  Heather Watson
  Zhang Shuai
  Zheng Jie

The following players received entry from the qualifying draw:
  Eugenie Bouchard
  Lauren Davis
  Misaki Doi
  Sharon Fichman
  Polona Hercog
  Chanelle Scheepers
  Sílvia Soler Espinosa
  Galina Voskoboeva

Withdrawals 
Before the tournament
  Marion Bartoli (retirement) → replaced by Daniela Hantuchová
  Jamie Hampton (left ankle injury) → replaced by Julia Görges
  Ekaterina Makarova → replaced by Monica Puig
  Romina Oprandi → replaced by Bojana Jovanovski
  Nadia Petrova (left hip injury) → replaced by Stefanie Vögele
  Maria Sharapova (right shoulder injury) → replaced by Annika Beck

Retirements
  Alizé Cornet (back injury)

WTA doubles main-draw entrants

Seeds

1 Rankings are as of September 23, 2013

Other entrants
The following pairs received wildcards into the doubles main draw:
  Svetlana Kuznetsova /  Samantha Stosur 
  Yaroslava Shvedova /  Zhang Shuai
  Sun Ziyue /  Zhang Yuxuan 
  Serena Williams /  Venus Williams
The following pair received entry as alternates:
  Sílvia Soler Espinosa /  Carla Suárez Navarro

Withdrawals
Before the tournament
  Marina Erakovic (personal reasons)
  Martina Hingis (personal reasons)

Champions

Men's singles 

 Novak Djokovic def.  Rafael Nadal, 6–3, 6-4

Women's singles 

 Serena Williams def.  Jelena Janković, 6–2, 6–2

Men's doubles 

 Max Mirnyi /  Horia Tecău def.  Fabio Fognini /  Andreas Seppi, 6–4, 6–2

Women's doubles 

 Cara Black /  Sania Mirza def.  Vera Dushevina /  Arantxa Parra Santonja, 6–2, 6–2

References

External links 
Official Website